Tahiri Elikana (born 14 September 1988) in the Cook Islands is a footballer who plays now as a goalkeeper. He played on 2019 and 2020 for Tupapa Maraerenga. From 2011 until 2015 he played in Avatiu. From 2011 until 2012 he held the position of defender. On the year of 2013 he started to play as a goalkeeper. From 2016 until 2019 Elikana did not represent any club.

Tahiri Elikana represented the national team of Cook Islands as a defender and also as goalkeeper. He has earned 9 caps for his nation, 2 of which he featured as goalkeeper. He did not suffer any goal in those 2 games just mentioned.

Career statistics

International

Statistics accurate as of match played until 30 May 2021

References

1988 births
Living people
Cook Islands international footballers
Association football goalkeepers
Cook Island footballers